Craig Ramage (born 30 March 1970) is a former footballer who played in midfield for six clubs.

Playing career
Born in Derby, Ramage started his career in his hometown as a trainee with Derby County. He played 42 games scoring four goals at Derby, during which time he also spent a short period on loan at Wigan Athletic.

In 1994, he made a £90,000 move to Watford. Ramage was a big hit at Vicarage Road and he finished just one game short of 100 starts. He was also a prolific scorer, and he netted 27 times in his 104 appearances. He spent a month on loan at Peterborough United in 1997 before he moved at the end of the season to Bradford City.

Ramage's time at City was a tough one. He was suspended for the start of the season and it was not until the seventh game against Middlesbrough he made his full debut. He made a total of 32 appearances but scored just once in the final game of the season as City lost 3–1 to Portsmouth.

Ramage was limited to just three substitute appearances in 1998-99 as Bradford earned promotion to the Premier League. It was little surprise that Ramage left during the summer to join Notts County where he started 50 games in three seasons.

Radio career
He worked as a commentator for BBC Radio Derby on Derby County matches, but was dropped by the BBC after he said in February 2020 that the "young black lads" in the Derby team (Max Lowe and Jayden Bogle) should "go back to basics, working hard".

References

External links

1970 births
Living people
Derby County F.C. players
Wigan Athletic F.C. players
Watford F.C. players
Peterborough United F.C. players
Bradford City A.F.C. players
Notts County F.C. players
English footballers
Footballers from Derby
English Football League players
England under-21 international footballers
People from Alvaston
Association football midfielders
English association football commentators